Schad is a surname. Notable people with the surname include:

Brenda Schad (born 1974), American model
Christian Schad (1894-1982), German painter 
Isabelle Schad (born 1970), German dancer and choreographer
James Louis Schad (1917-2002), American Catholic bishop
Jocinei Schad  (born 1990), Brazilian football player
Joe Schad (born 1974), American sports writer
Mike Schad (born 1963), American football player
Tobias Schad (born 1991), German rower

See also
Schad v. Arizona